Kääpa is a village in Võru Parish, Võru County in Estonia.

References

Villages in Võru County